Ebrahimabad (also Romanized as Ebrāhīmābād; also known as Ebrāhīmābād-e Fūlādlū, Fūlādī, Qeshlāq-e Fūlādī, and Qishlāq Faulādi) is a village in Hakimabad Rural District, in the Central District of Zarandieh County, Markazi Province, Iran. At the 2006 census, its population was 22, in 5 families.

References 

Populated places in Zarandieh County